Ellerslie School was founded in 1877, making it one of the oldest schools in Auckland, New Zealand. It is a Year 1 to Year 8 school.

Ellerslie has a roll of  students (as of ), with most students living in the Ellerslie/Greenlane area.

Ellerslie School is in zone for One Tree Hill College.

The current principal is Nick Butler.

The Intermediate area of the school was upgraded in 2007, has a multi-purpose technology block and a state of the art music suite.

Notes

Primary schools in Auckland
Educational institutions established in 1877
1877 establishments in New Zealand